Seboruco is one of the forty subbarrios of Santurce, San Juan, Puerto Rico.

Demographics
In 2000, Seboruco had a population of 2,198.

In 2010, Seboruco had a population of 1,878 and a population density of 26,828.6 persons per square mile.

See also
 
 List of communities in Puerto Rico

References

Santurce, San Juan, Puerto Rico
Municipality of San Juan